Churchill Odia (born 21 November 1985 in Lagos) was a Nigerian college basketball player with the University of Oregon Ducks men's basketball team. In 2007, he played with the Nigeria national basketball team at the FIBA Africa Championship 2007.

Sources
 Player Profile espn.com
 Biography goducks.com

1985 births
Living people
Nigerian men's basketball players
Oregon Ducks men's basketball players
Small forwards
Sportspeople from Lagos